North Country is a 2005 American drama film directed by Niki Caro, starring Charlize Theron, Frances McDormand, Sean Bean, Richard Jenkins, Michelle Monaghan, Jeremy Renner, Woody Harrelson, and Sissy Spacek. The screenplay by Michael Seitzman was inspired by the 2002 book Class Action: The Story of Lois Jenson and the Landmark Case That Changed Sexual Harassment Law by Clara Bingham and Laura Leedy Gansler, which chronicled the case of Jenson v. Eveleth Taconite Company.

Plot
In 1989, Josey Aimes flees from her abusive husband back to her hometown in northern Minnesota with her children, Sammy and Karen, and moves in with her parents, Alice and Hank. Hank is ashamed of Josey, who had Sammy as a teenager by an unknown father, and believes Josey is promiscuous. While working a job washing hair, Josey reconnects with an old acquaintance, Glory Dodge, who works at the local iron mine and suggests Josey do the same, as a job there pays six times more than what Josey's making now. When Josey takes the job, her relationship with Hank becomes strained. Hank also works at the mine and believes women shouldn't be working there, so Josey and her children move in with Glory and her husband, Kyle.

Josey quickly befriends several other female workers at the mine and soon realizes the women are constant targets for sexual harassment and humiliation by most of their male co-workers, who, like Hank, believe the women are taking jobs more appropriate for men. Josey in particular is targeted by Bobby Sharp, her ex-boyfriend from high school. Josey tries to talk to her supervisor, Arlen Pavich, about the problem, but he refuses to take her concerns seriously. The women experience additional harassment and even abuse in retaliation, and Bobby spreads rumors that Josey attempted to seduce him, leading his wife to publicly berate and humiliate Josey at Sammy's hockey game. Sammy begins to resent the way the townspeople treat them and comes to believe the gossip about his mother's alleged promiscuity.

Josey takes her concerns to the mine's owner, Don Pearson, but despite his previous assurances that he is there to help, she arrives to find that he has invited Pavich to the meeting, along with several other executives and offers to accept her resignation immediately. She refuses, and after Pearson implies he believes the rumors about her promiscuity, leaves devastated. Later, after being sexually assaulted by Bobby at work, she resigns and asks Bill White, a lawyer friend of Kyle and Glory, to help her file a lawsuit against the company. Bill advises her to recruit other women to form a class action lawsuit, which would be the first of its kind. The female miners, however, fear losing their jobs and facing additional harassment, so Josey attempts to go ahead with the case alone. She also discovers that Glory has Lou Gehrig's Disease, and her health is declining rapidly.

Alice and Hank argue over Josey's lawsuit, and when Hank still refuses to forgive his daughter, Alice leaves him. At a union meeting, Josey attempts to address the miners and explain her reasons for suing the mine, but they constantly interrupt and insult her, leading Hank to stand up for his daughter and reprimand his co-workers for their treatment of Josey and all the women at the mine. He and Alice then reconcile. In court, the mining company's attorney attempts to hold Josey's sexual history against her, based on Bobby's testimony that Sammy is the result of a consensual sexual relationship between Josey and her high school teacher, Paul Lattavansky. Josey then reveals that after school one day, where she and Bobby had been serving detention together after being caught kissing, she was raped by Lattavansky, which led to her becoming pregnant with Sammy. Hank attacks the teacher in question and Bill gets a recess after Josey storms out of the courtroom.

Sammy still refuses to believe his mother and runs away, until Kyle urges him to reconsider, and he and Josey embrace after having a talk. Bill cross-examines Bobby and gets him to admit he witnessed  Lattavansky rape Josey, but was too scared to do anything about it. Glory, who has come to the court in her wheelchair and is unable to speak, has Kyle read a letter saying she stands with Josey, though still not enough to qualify for a class action suit. After a pause, many other women stand, followed by family members and even several male miners who didn't harass the female ones. The mining company is forced to pay the women for their suffering and establish a landmark sexual harassment policy at the workplace.

Cast

 Charlize Theron as Josephine "Josey" Aimes
 Amber Heard as young Josey
 Frances McDormand as Glory Dodge
 Sean Bean as Kyle Dodge
 Richard Jenkins as Henry "Hank" Aimes
 Jeremy Renner as Robert "Bobby" Sharp
 Cole Williams as young Bobby
 Michelle Monaghan as Sherry
 Thomas Curtis as Samuel "Sammy" Aimes
 Woody Harrelson as Bill White
 Sissy Spacek as Alice Aimes
 Tom Bower as Gray Suchett
 Linda Emond as Leslie Conlin
 Rusty Schwimmer as Big Betty
 Jillian Armenante as Peg
 Xander Berkeley as Arlen Pavich
 Chris Mulkey as Earl Slangley
 Corey Stoll as Ricky Sennett
 Brad William Henke as Mr. Lattavansky
 John Aylward as Judge Halsted
 Marcus Chait as Wayne

Production
Lois Jenson, on whom the character of Josey is based, actually began working at the EVTAC (from "Eveleth Taconite") mine in Eveleth, Minnesota, in 1975 and initiated her lawsuit in 1984, four years before the year in which the film begins. Its timeline was condensed, but in reality it took fourteen years for the case to be settled. Jenson declined to sell the rights to her story or act as the film's consultant.

The character Glory Dodge, played by Frances McDormand, was based on Pat Kosmach, one of the plaintiffs in the class action suit. Kosmach died partway through the case, on November 7, 1994. Eveleth Mines settled four years later, in December 1998, paying fifteen women a total of $3.5 million.

The film was shot in the northern Minnesota towns of Eveleth, Virginia, Chisholm, and Hibbing; Minneapolis; as well as Silver City and Santa Fe in New Mexico.

Soundtrack
 "North Country" by Gustavo Santaolalla – 2:08
 "Girl of the North Country" by Leo Kottke – 3:33
 "Tell Ol' Bill" by Bob Dylan – 5:08
 "Werewolves of London" by Warren Zevon – 3:28
 "Bette Davis Eyes" by Kim Carnes – 3:49
 "If I Said You Had a Beautiful Body (Would You Hold It Against Me)" by The Bellamy Brothers – 3:17
 "Lay Lady Lay" by Bob Dylan – 3:19
 "A Saturday in My Classroom" by Gustavo Santaolalla – 3:46
 "Sweetheart Like You" by Bob Dylan – 4:37
 "Baby Don't Get Hooked on Me" by Mac Davis – 3:05
 "Do Right to Me Baby (Do Unto Others)" by Bob Dylan – 3:52
 "Standing Up" by Gustavo Santaolalla – 2:43
 "Paths of Victory" by Cat Power – 3:24

Songs in the film that weren't in the soundtrack release include "Wasn't That a Party" by The Irish Rovers, "Shake the House Down" by Molly Hatchet and karaoke versions of George Thorogood's "I Drink Alone" and Pat Benatar's "Hit Me with Your Best Shot."

Release

The film premiered at the 2005 Toronto International Film Festival and was shown at the Chicago International Film Festival before going into theatrical release in the US, where it grossed $6,422,455 in its opening weekend, ranking 5th at the box office. Budgeted at $30 million, it eventually grossed $18,337,722 in the US and $6,873,453 in foreign markets for a total worldwide box office of $25,211,175.

Reception

Critical response
On the review aggregator Rotten Tomatoes, 69% of critics gave the film positive reviews, based on 176 reviews, and an average rating of 6.7/10, with Theron and McDormand receiving critical acclaim for their performances. The site's consensus states: "Though sometimes melodramatic and formulaic, North Country is nonetheless a rousing, powerful story of courage and humanity."<ref>[https://www.rottentomatoes.com/m/north_country/ North Country at Rotten Tomatoes.com]. Rotten Tomatoes. Retrieved on March 2, 2023.</ref> On Metacritic, the film has an average score of 68 out of 100, based on 39 reviews. Audiences polled by CinemaScore gave the film an average grade of "A-" on an A+ to F scale.

Manohla Dargis of the New York Times called it "a star vehicle with heart – an old-fashioned liberal weepie about truth and justice" and added, "[It] is one of those Hollywood entertainments that strive to tell a hard, bitter story with as much uplift as possible. That the film works as well as it does, delivering a tough first hour only to disintegrate like a wet newspaper, testifies to the skill of the filmmakers as well as to the constraints brought on them by an industry that insists on slapping a pretty bow on even the foulest truth."

In his review in the Chicago Sun-Times, Roger Ebert observed, "North Country is one of those movies that stir you up and make you mad, because it dramatizes practices you've heard about but never really visualized. We remember that Frances McDormand played a woman police officer in this same area in Fargo, and we value that memory, because it provides a foundation for Josey Aimes. McDormand's role in this movie is different and much sadder, but brings the same pluck and common sense to the screen. Put these two women together (as actors and characters) and they can accomplish just about anything. Watching them do it is a great movie experience."

Ruthe Stein of the San Francisco Chronicle called the film a "compelling if occasionally unnecessarily convoluted movie . . . The first 15 minutes or so are a mess . . . Fortunately, [it] calms down and becomes extremely engrossing, especially in the courtroom battles . . . it's all carefully calculated for dramatic effect and succeeds brilliantly in drawing you in and eliciting tears in the process . . . North Country would have benefited from crisper editing. It runs at least 15 minutes longer than necessary . . . For all its flaws, [it] delivers an emotional wallop and a couple of performances worthy of recognition come award time."

In Rolling Stone, Peter Travers awarded the film two out of a possible four stars and commented, "Any similarities between Josey and Lois Jenson, the real woman who made Eveleth Mines pay for their sins in a landmark 1988 class-action suit, are purely coincidental. Instead, we get a TV-movie fantasy of female empowerment glazed with soap-opera theatrics. The actors, director Niki Caro (Whale Rider) and the great cinematographer Chris Menges all labor to make things look authentic. But a crock is a crock, despite the ferocity and feeling Theron brings to the role . . . Though the dirt and grime in North Country are artfully applied, it's purely cosmetic and skin-deep."

In "Stories from North Country," a documentary accompanying the film on the DVD, Lois Jenson, on whom the story is based, said, "I think it's important for people to see this." Regarding Charlize Theron, Jenson said, "She has the character. [...] She knew the part. She knew what it needed – the depth she needed to go to. She's done a great job with it."

David Rooney of Variety said, "[It] indulges in movie-ish manipulation in its climactic courtroom scenes. But it remains an emotionally potent story told with great dignity, to which women especially will respond . . . The film represents a confident next step for lead Charlize Theron. Though the challenges of following a career-redefining Oscar role have stymied actresses, Theron segues from Monster to a performance in many ways more accomplished . . . The strength of both the performance and character anchor the film firmly in the tradition of other dramas about working-class women leading the fight over industrial workplace issues, such as Norma Rae or Silkwood."

In the St. Petersburg Times, Steve Persall graded the film A and called it "deeply, undeniably moving . . . crusader cinema at its finest."

Awards and nominations

See also
 List of American films of 2005
 Sexual harassment
 Hostile environment sexual harassment
 Wildrose Michelle Vinson v. Merit One Savings Bank Oncale v. Sundowner Offshore Services''

References

External links
 
 
 
 
 
 Jenson Vs. Eveleth Mines and North Country, the true story which served as the basis for the film
 About the filming of North Country

2000s English-language films
2000s American films
2000s legal drama films
2000s feminist films
2005 films
2005 drama films
American legal drama films
American rape and revenge films
Films based on non-fiction books
Films directed by Niki Caro
Films scored by Gustavo Santaolalla
Films about sexual harassment
Films about rape
Films about the working class
Films about mining
Films about the labor movement
Films set in 1989
Films set in Minnesota
Films shot in Minnesota
Films shot in New Mexico
Participant (company) films
Warner Bros. films